Chadi Marwan Harb (born 23 March 1993) is a Lebanese former footballer who played as a forward.

International career
Harb played for Lebanon in three friendly games in 2014, against Qatar, Saudi Arabia, and the United Arab Emirates.

Personal life
Harb's brother, Daniel, is also a footballer.

See also
 List of Lebanon international footballers born outside Lebanon

References

External links
 
 

1993 births
Living people
People from Rohatyn
Association football forwards
Lebanese footballers
Al Mabarra Club players
Al Shabab Al Arabi Club Beirut players
Sagesse SC footballers
Lebanon international footballers
Lebanese Second Division players
Lebanese people of Ukrainian descent
Ukrainian people of Lebanese descent
Sportspeople of Lebanese descent